A chip butty is a sandwich filled with chips (thick-cut deep fried potatoes, similar to steak fries), optionally eaten with condiments such as brown sauce, ketchup, mayonnaise, or malt vinegar. The bread may be slices from a loaf or a bread roll, and is usually buttered. The chip butty can be found in fish and chip shops and other casual dining establishments in the British Isles.

Other names for the sandwich may relate to the variety of bread used, such as chip roll or chip muffin, or a regional type of bread roll such as chip bap, chip cob or chip barm.

Scallop butty
A variation frequently seen in the North of England is the scallop butty, in which potato scallops (potato slices that have been battered and deep fried) are used in place of chips.

Cultural context and references
Kate Fox noted in her book Watching the English, "even if you call it a chip sandwich rather than a butty, it is about as working-class as food can get".

A football chant called "The Greasy Chip Butty Song" (sung to the tune of "Annie's Song" by John Denver) is popular with the supporters of Sheffield United Football Club.

See also
Crisp sandwich, a sandwich filled with crisps (potato chips)
List of sandwiches
Mitraillette, a Belgian sandwich filled with French fries (chips)
Po' boy, a sandwich from Louisiana sometimes filled with French fries
French tacos, a French fast-food item containing French fries (chips) wrapped in a flour tortilla

References

British sandwiches
Irish cuisine
Potato dishes